Quererte Así (Loving You Like This) is a Mexican telenovela produced by Eric Vonn for Azteca. Filming lasted from 30 January 2012 to 15 June 2012. During the week of 16 April, TV Azteca broadcast Quererte Así weeknights at 7:30pm. From 23 April to 25 May, TV Azteca moved the telenovela from 7:30pm to 6pm. From 28 May – 3 August 2012, it was moved again from 6pm to 4pm.

Episodes

References

Lists of Mexican television series episodes